This is a list of notable ice storms.

1940s
Great Ice Storm of November 23–25, 1940.

1970s
Twin North Carolina Ice Storms of January 12–13 and 19-20, 1978

1990s

Western and Northern NY Ice Storm of March 3–4, 1991
January 1998 North American ice storm
January 1999 North American ice storm

2000s
2002 Central Plains ice storm
North Carolina ice storm of 2002
December 2005 North American ice storm
January 2007 North American ice storm
Mid-December 2007 North American winter storms
December 2008 Northeastern United States ice storm
January 2009 North American ice storm

2010s
2011 Groundhog Day blizzard
December 2013 North American storm complex
Late January 2014 Slovenian ice storm
February 2014 nor'easter
December 15–17, 2018 United Kingdom ice storm

2020s
2020-21 New Year's North American storm complex
February 2021 North American ice storm
January 14–17, 2022 North American winter storm

See also

 List of blizzards
 List of weather records
 Lowest temperature recorded on Earth

References

List
Weather-related lists